Warren Ramsay Donald (born 7 October 1964) is an English footballer who played as a midfielder in the Football League in the 1980s and 1990s.

Career

Born in Hillingdon, he joined West Ham United as an apprentice, making two League appearances for them. His debut came on 26 December 1983 as a substitute against Southampton, whilst his final game was the last match of the 1983-84 season, against Everton.

After an initial loan spell at Northampton Town, he joined the Cobblers on a permanent basis during 1985-86. Donald went on to play 188 League games for them in total, and was a member of the side that won promotion from the Fourth Division in 1986-87. In 1989-90 Northampton were relegated and he joined Colchester United in the close season.

Colchester had just been relegated to the GM Vauxhall Conference, but Donald helped them win promotion in his second season with the U's, missing just one League game as they edged Wycombe Wanderers to promotion. Donald played in 9 of their first 10 Football League games in 1992–93, but then only played one more league match (on 28 November), before his final senior appearance for the club - a Football League Trophy match against his former side Northampton Town on 1 December 1992. Overall, he made 79 league appearances for the club over two and a half seasons.

He subsequently returned to the Conference when he transferred to Kettering Town for the remainder of the 1992-93 season. In 1993-94 he missed only one league match for the Poppies, as they narrowly missed out on promotion to the League, being pipped by Kidderminster Harriers.

His last games for Kettering were in the 1994-95 season when he played 21 league matches. He subsequently played for Nuneaton Borough, Raunds Town, Daventry Town and Stamford Town.

Honours

Northampton Town
 Football League Fourth Division Winner: 1986–87

References 

1964 births
Association football midfielders
English Football League players
West Ham United F.C. players
Northampton Town F.C. players
Colchester United F.C. players
Kettering Town F.C. players
Nuneaton Borough F.C. players
Stamford A.F.C. players
Living people
Daventry Town F.C. players
Footballers from Hillingdon
English footballers